Nikos Kritikos (born 1 November 1994) is a Greek professional footballer who plays as a defensive midfielder.

References

1994 births
Living people
Greek footballers
Greece youth international footballers
Super League Greece players
Football League (Greece) players
Super League Greece 2 players
A.O. Kerkyra players
PAE Kerkyra players
Panionios F.C. players
Apollon Smyrnis F.C. players
Ionikos F.C. players
Panserraikos F.C. players
Association football midfielders
Sportspeople from Corfu
Olympiacos F.C. players